Papaqucha (Quechua papa potato, qucha lake, "potato lake", hispanicized spelling Papacocha) is a lake in Peru located in the Lima Region, Yauyos Province, Huancaya District. It lies at the Cañete River, near the town Vilca.

References 

Lakes of Peru
Lakes of Lima Region